Gomaji Naik Pansambal was a warrior and military adviser in the army of Shivaji Maharaj, founder of the Maratha Empire in 17th century India. Gomaji was deputed by Lakhuji Jadhavrao. He was also a guru of Shivaji, also taught him artillery and the practice of war, especially the lance and guerilla warfare, the characteristic Maratha weapon.

References

Bibliography
Duff, Grant - History of the Marhattas, Oxford University Press, London.

People of the Maratha Empire
Educators from Maharashtra